Yarrow Cheney (born 1973) is an American artist, film director, designer, author, illustrator, and animator. He is best known for his works as a production designer in Despicable Me 2 (2013), The Lorax (2012), and Despicable Me (2010) for which he received Primetime Emmy and Annie Awards nominations.

In 2016, Cheney co-directed Illumination Entertainment's The Secret Life of Pets with Chris Renaud, that received positive reviews and became the sixth highest grossing-film of 2016. He directed The Grinch (2018), with Scott Mosier.

His debut children's book Superworld: Save Noah, the first in a middle grade series written by his wife Carrie Cheney, publishes on October 4, 2022.

Early life 
Cheney was born to Jack Cheney and Caryn Brady in 1973. He attended California Institute of the Arts from 1992-1995.

Filmography

Animation
 The Iron Giant (1999): CGI animator
 Quest for Camelot (1998): Animator  
 Cats Don't Dance (1997): Animator

Director
 The Grinch (2018) also character designer 
 The Secret Life of Pets (co-director) (2016)
 Puppy (2013): Short, also writer 
 The Very First Noel (2006) (re-released in 2020 as The Three Wise Men): Video Short, also editor, art director and producer

Production designer
 Despicable Me 2 (2013)  
 The Lorax (2012) 
 Despicable Me (2010)  
 The Very First Noel (2006): Video short
 Curious George (2006)   
 The ChubbChubbs! (2002): Short

Other 
 Dilbert (1999): main title designer
 Mummies Alive! (1997): concept artist
 The Maxx (1995): TV Mini-Series, background layout artist, 7 episodes

Awards and nominations
 2014: Outstanding Achievement in Production Design in an Animated Feature Production - Despicable Me 2 (nom) (shared with Eric Guillon)   
 2013: Annie Award for Best Character Design in an Animated Feature Production -The Lorax (nom) (shared withEric Guillon and Colin Stimpson) 
 2011: Annie Award for Best Production Design in an Animated Feature Production - Despicable Me (nom)
 1999: Primetime Emmy Award for Outstanding Main Title Design - Dilbert (shared with Carrie Cheney)

References

External links
  
 

20th-century births
Year of birth missing (living people)
Place of birth missing (living people)
Living people
American animators
American graphic designers
American film directors
American animated film directors
Illumination (company) people